Melisa Döngel (born 18 September 1999) is a Turkish actress and model best known for her role as Deniz Çelik in the drama series Bizim Hikaye.

Life and career
Melisa Döngel was born on 18 September 1999. She completed her education at Osman Yağmurdereli Art Academy. She started her acting career with the Elif series, which premiered in 2014. In 2016, she played the character of Sevtap in the TV series Hangimiz Sevmedik. In the same year, she played the character of Nil in the TV series Arka Sokaklar. In 2018, she appeared as Deniz Çelik in the drama series Bizim Hikaye in which she gained acclaim for portraying the character. In the series Sen Çal Kapımı, which started to be broadcast on FOX in 2020, she portrays the character of Ceren Başar. Döngel was forced to withdraw from the series for a few episodes due to a problem in her intestines.

In July 2021, it was revealed that Döngel was involved in a legal battle against her father over the custody of her younger sister. She had been molested by her father as a child and he was later imprisoned.

Filmography

References

External links

1999 births
Living people
Turkish Muslims
Turkish television actresses
21st-century Turkish actresses
Models from Istanbul
Turkish people of Russian descent
Actresses from Istanbul